A 2020 Tour Card is needed to compete in Professional Darts Corporation ProTour tournaments.

In total 128 players are granted Tour Cards, which enables them to participate in all Players Championships and European Tour Qualifiers.

Most Tour Cards are valid for 2 years. The top 64 in the PDC Order of Merit all receive Tour Cards automatically, and those who won a two-year card in 2019 still had a valid card for 2020. The top 2 of the 2019 Challenge Tour and Development Tour also won cards. The remaining places were awarded at the 2020 Q-Schools, with four days of competition awarding two Tour Cards per day from the UK Q-School and one a day from the European Q-School; with the remaining players being ranked and the top players also receiving Tour Cards. All players who won a card at either Q-School had their Order of Merit ranking reset to zero.

Raymond van Barneveld retired after the 2020 PDC World Darts Championship, and Corey Cadby also resigned his card which allowed Toni Alcinas and Simon Stevenson to move into the top 64 and retain their Tour Cards. Jamie Bain resigned his Tour Card after the 2020 PDC World Darts Championship, as he couldn't commit to the full schedule, which opened a space in Q-School as Bain was outside the Top 64.

Players

Tour Cards per Nations

See also
List of darts players
List of darts players who have switched organisation

References 

2020 PDC Pro Tour
2020 in darts
Lists of darts players